Ann Catrina Coleman (Ann Catrina Bryce) FIEEE FOSA is a Scottish electrical engineer and professor at the University of Texas at Dallas specialising in semiconductor lasers.

Currently she is an Associate Vice President (for membership development) of the Photonics Society. Other professional activities include Associate Editor IEEE Journal of Quantum Electronics (2007 - 2013), Elected Member of the IEEE LEOS Board of Governors (2004 – 2006), General Co-chair of Conference on Lasers and Electro-Optics (CLEO): Science and Innovations (2013), Program Co-chair of Conference on Lasers and Electro-Optics (CLEO): Science and Innovations (2011).

Biography 

Coleman was born in Glasgow, Scotland, in 1956, the first daughter of Nora (McColl) and Vincent Redvers Hanna. She was educated at St. Stephen's Primary School in Dalmuir and Notre Dame High School in Dumbarton. She then graduated with a BSc degree in physics from the University of Glasgow in 1978, and took teacher training at St. Andrews College of Education in Bearsden. After two years as a high school physics teacher, she returned to the University of Glasgow and was awarded the PhD in physics in 1987.

After graduating, she remained at the University of Glasgow. She joined the Optoelectronics Group of the Department of Electronics and Electrical Engineering at the University of Glasgow as a postdoctoral research assistant and was appointed a research fellow in 1992, becoming a senior research fellow in 1997 and professorial research fellow in 2005. She and the other members of this group are primarily recognised for their pioneering work on fabricating photonic integrated circuits on III-V semiconductor chips based on quantum well intermixing.

In 2012, Coleman joined the Department of Electrical and Computer Engineering at the University of Illinois Urbana-Champaign working in the Micro and Nanotechnology Laboratory. In 2013, she moved to the University of Texas at Dallas as professor of electrical engineering and materials science and engineering.

Honours and professional activities 
Coleman was elected a fellow of the Institute of Electrical and Electronics Engineers in 2008 for contributions to compound semiconductor integrated optoelectronic devices, and fellow of the Optical Society of America in 2009. In 2006 she shared (with J.H. Marsh) the IEEE Photonics Society (formerly Lasers and Electro-Optics Society) Engineering Achievement Award for extensive development and commercialization of quantum well intermixing for photonic devices. Coleman has been an elected board member and vice president of the IEEE Photonics Society. She has published more than 100 papers in scholarly journals with more than 40 invited presentations and publications.

References 

Scottish physicists
Scottish electrical engineers
Living people
1956 births
Scottish women physicists
Fellow Members of the IEEE
Academics of the University of Glasgow
Alumni of the University of Glasgow
University of Illinois Urbana-Champaign faculty
20th-century British physicists
21st-century British physicists
20th-century British women scientists
21st-century British women scientists
20th-century Scottish scientists
21st-century Scottish scientists
University of Texas at Dallas faculty
Scottish women academics
Fellows of Optica (society)
Women in optics
20th-century Scottish women
21st-century Scottish women